Azerbaijanis in Kyrgyzstan are part of the Azerbaijani diaspora. They are Kyrgyz citizens and permanent residents of ethnic Azerbaijani background. Azerbaijan and  Kyrgyzstan used to be part of the Russian Empire and later the Soviet Union. As of 2009, there were 17,267 Azerbaijanis resident in Kyrgyzstan.

See also  
Azerbaijan–Kyrgyzstan relations
Turkic Council

References 

Ethnic groups in Kyrgyzstan
Azerbaijani diaspora
Azerbaijani emigrants to Kyrgyzstan